Unterschönau is a village and a former municipality in the district Schmalkalden-Meiningen, in Thuringia, Germany. Since 1 January 2019, it is part of the town Steinbach-Hallenberg.

History
From 1868 to 1944, Unterschönau was part of the Prussian Province of Hesse-Nassau.

References

Former municipalities in Thuringia
Schmalkalden-Meiningen